{{DISPLAYTITLE:C6H4O2}}
The molecular formula C6H4O2 (molar mass: 108.09 g/mol, exact mass: 108.0211 u) may refer to:

 1,2-Benzoquinone, also called ortho-benzoquinone
 1,4-Benzoquinone, also called para-quinone